Phool Bane Angaray is a 1991 Indian Hindi-language film directed by K.C. Bokadia and stars Rekha and Rajinikanth in the lead roles. The film did well commercially, and Rekha was praised for her performance.

Plot
Dutta Babu is standing for elections in Udaipur, against a cunning, corrupt, & established gangster, Bishamber Prasad, who is also powerful and influential enough to swing the election his way, as well as have Dutta killed. Inspector Ranjit Singh gets evidence about Bishamber's involvement in Dutta's death, but his superior officer, DSP Ravi Khanna, prevents him from taking any action. Ranjit then meets with beautiful Namrata, and both get married. As Ranjit continues to be a thorn on Bishamber's side, he is killed, leaving behind a sorrowing Namrata.  Namrata pledges to avenge his death. His courageous wife then joins the police force to avenge his death.

Cast

Soundtrack

References

External links
 

1990s Hindi-language films
1991 films
Films scored by Bappi Lahiri
Films shot in Rajasthan
Films directed by K. C. Bokadia